The Sensuous Woman is a book written by Terry Garrity and issued by Lyle Stuart. Published first during 1969 with the pseudonym "J", it is a detailed instruction manual concerning sexuality for women. It is notable for greater frankness in discussing sex than other literature of its era.

Summary

Some of the most confusing and lonely experiences of J's life, as well as the most beautiful ones, have been sexual. She believes women in the modern era have great potential for enjoyable sex, orgasms, and greater intimacy with their husband or lovers.

She recommends women heighten their sensitivity with various tactile experiences, taking sensuous baths, dancing, and most importantly masturbation, with various approaches described. J stresses that masturbation and sex are normal and wholesome activities, and that women should ignore those who attempt to make them feel shame about these things.

The author gives tips about fashion and voice training. She encourages readers to look after their health, including early treatment for venereal disease. The reader is encouraged to keep a diary of her sexual appetite, to clarify her sexual ethics, and to practice sexual role-play to keep relationships interesting.

J discusses how to select sexual partners, both for casual sex and marriage. She explains various sexual techniques, including how be a giving partner while still looking after one's own pleasure. She gives advice on attending orgies, including how to avoid advances from lesbians. Finally, she discusses how to open your heart to love and contentment.

Reception

The book was a best-seller and remained popular for years because its frankness about sex was rare in books from its era. The author had "thought about the unthinkable," according to the New York Times, by attempting to demystify sex in an era when sex was normally hinted at indirectly.

Some readers were very angry about the book. Garrity was besieged with demands for details of her personal life. Her real name was leaked to Time magazine by her publisher, according to Garrity, which resulted in increased attacks on her, including several attempts at sexual assault. Her mental health suffered because of the fame of the book and hostile reactions to it.

It was among the six books chosen by career columnist Penelope Trunk for her list of "best books," as published in the September 21, 2007 edition of The Week magazine.

Cultural references

The album Music for Sensuous Lovers by "Z", released by Mort Garson in 1971, is a quote from the book's title.

See also

The Sensuous Man

References 

1969 non-fiction books
American non-fiction books
Books by Terry Garrity
English-language books
Sex manuals
Works published under a pseudonym
Barricade Books titles